Shantae Barnes-Cowan is an Australian actress. She is a Adnyamathanha woman who starred in Wyrmwood: Apocalypse, Sweet As and the TV series Firebite. Other roles include Total Control and Operation Buffalo.

Filmography
Films
Wyrmwood: Apocalypse (2021)
Sweet As (2022)

TV
Firebite (2021-2022)
Total Control (2019-21)
Operation Buffalo (2020)

References

External links
 

 
Living people
Australian film actresses
Australian television actresses
Indigenous Australian actresses